The Original Townsite Historic District in Raton, New Mexico is a historic district which was listed on the National Register of Historic Places in 2008.

The district is a  roughly bounded by Clark & Cimmaron Avenues, S. 2nd & S. 7th Streets within Raton, a town that was platted in 1880.  The district included 360 contributing buildings, a contributing structure, and a contributing structure.

It includes works by architects William M. Rapp & Isaac H. Rapp.

It includes:
the George Pace House (1907), South Fifth Street, designed by George C. Burnett

References

National Register of Historic Places in Colfax County, New Mexico
Queen Anne architecture in New Mexico

Buildings and structures completed in 1880